Tum Bin 2 is a 2016 Indian Hindi-language romantic drama film, written and directed by Anubhav Sinha. It was produced by Sinha and Bhushan Kumar, under the T-Series banner. It is a standalone sequel to the 2001 film, Tum Bin. The film was released on 18 November 2016.

Plot
The film centers around the life of Taran (Neha Sharma), who loses her fiancé Amar (Aashim Gulati) in a skiing accident. Her life changes when she meets Shekhar Malhotra (Aditya Seal) who she initially sees as a good friend, but soon develops feelings for. Eventually she shares a kiss with Shekhar marking the start of her process of moving on with her life.

The plot takes a sudden twist when it is revealed that Amar has survived the accident and has been in coma as an unidentified patient for the last eight months. He returns home after regaining consciousness. On learning of Amar's return, Shekhar decides to distance himself for Taran and her family. Eventually, Taran realizes that she continues to have feelings for Shekhar and tells Amar about what happened when he was away. Together they decide to break up and stay close friends. Taran goes back to dating Shekhar. What Amar does not tell Taran is that he is only pretending to be okay with the breakup. And that he is very hurt and miserable without her. In the meanwhile, Shekhar starts to notice that though Taran is dating him, she too misses Amar. When he speaks to Taran about this she confesses to having chosen him over Amar because "it was the right thing to do". Especially after all Shekhar had done for her in Amar's absence. Once when Taran runs off to help Amar, Shekhar gets very upset and refuses to speak to Taran a number of days. Eventually, he calls Taran to inform her that he's leaving the country.

The plot takes another twist when trying to find Shekhar, Taran accompanied by Amar and his father (Kanwaljit Singh) discover that Shekhar was responsible for Amar's accident. In a further twist, Amar's father confesses that he knew this all along. He also tells of Shekhar coming to him seeking forgiveness for the accident. And how he not only forgave Shekhar but also started seeing him as a son. He also confesses to having intentionally introduced Shekhar to Taran and her family in the hope of helping Taran overcome her grief.

On learning all of this, Taran along with Amar and his father hurry to the airport where they spot Shekhar about to board a plane. Eventually, Shekhar prevails over Taran explaining that dating him because "it was the right thing to do" is not enough and she should be with the one she loves the most. He eventually hugs both Taran and Amar, and departs tearfully. Taran hugs Amar but looks tearfully at Shekhar departing.

Cast

Production

Filming
The official announcement of the film was in March 2016 and the principal photography commenced in April 2016. The film was released on 18 November 2016. The film was shot mainly in Glasgow and other regions in Scotland.

Soundtrack
The soundtrack of the movie was composed by Ankit Tiwari with lyrics written by Manoj Muntashir, except for the track "Teri Fariyad" which was written by Shakeel Azmi based on the original ghazal by Faaiz Anwar.

Track listing

References

External links

T-Series (company) films
2016 films
2010s Hindi-language films
Films shot in Scotland
Indian romantic drama films
Indian sequel films
2016 romantic drama films